Altus Group Limited provides software, and independent advisory services to the global commercial real estate (CRE) industry through its two core business segments: Altus Analytics and CRE Consulting. The company is headquartered in Toronto, Canada and employs approximately 2,200 employees with operations in North America, Europe and Asia Pacific.It is a public company, with its shares listed on the Toronto Stock Exchange under the symbol AIF, and Altus Group’s market capitalization is around $2 billion as of the end of 2020. For fiscal 2019, the company had annual revenues of C$567 million and C$88.1 million in adjusted EBITDA.

History

2005―2011: Inception under Gary Yeoman 
Altus Group went public in 2005, through the merger of three Canadian commercial real estate consultancies, one of which was led by its first CEO, Gary Yeoman. Altus initially listed on the Toronto Stock Exchange as an income trust and subsequently converted into a corporation when the Canadian federal government implemented new taxes on trust distributions in 2011. The company originally focused on consulting services for the commercial real estate industry but over the years has also repositioned itself as a technology company to help clients manage their commercial real estate portfolios.

In 2006, Altus Group expanded into the land surveying industry in Western Canada which formed its Geomatics business segment. The Geomatics business was subsequently spun off in 2020, into the private company called GeoVerra that combined Altus Group’s Geomatics business with WSP’s geomatics operations.

In its first five years, the company expanded through acquisitions. These acquisitions primarily focused on the company’s property tax business. Altus Group’s property tax practice expanded into the UK market in 2007, with the acquisition of Edwin Hill. Expansion in the UK continued, including through the acquisition of Commercial Valuers & Surveyors (CVS) in 2017. Starting in 2010, the company also grew its property tax practice in the US, mainly through the acquisitions of Brazos Tax in 2010, Complex Property Advisors in 2013, and SC&H Group’s State & Local Tax Practice in 2014. The company also expanded its cost consulting practice to the Asia Pacific region through the acquisition of Page Kirkland in 2009.

The firm's’s shift to technology began with the acquisition of Argus Software in 2011. The current Altus Analytics business segment includes software, data solutions, and advisory offerings, including PricewaterhouseCoopers’s valuation management practice that was acquired in 2010. Acquiring ARGUS Software marked the first time that Altus Group entered the commercial real estate software industry.

2011―2020: Expansion into Software and Data under Robert Courteau 
In 2011, Gary Yeoman stepped down as CEO and in 2012, Robert Courteau joined  as the new CEO. He had previously served as president of SAP North America, an enterprise application software company. Under Courteau’s leadership, the company continued its expansion into software. In 2014, it acquired Voyanta, a data management SaaS solution for CRE investors, and in 2018, it acquired Taliance, a provider of modelling and forecasting tools for CRE investors. In 2019, it launched a cloud-supported version of its Argus Enterprise product, used as an asset and investment management platform by the commercial real estate industry.

2020―Present: "Intelligence-as-service" strategy under Mike Gordon 
In September 2020, Courteau retired and was succeeded as CEO by Mike Gordon. Gordon was most recently CEO of Callcredit Information Group, a U.K.-based provider of consumer data for businesses. Under Gordon, the firm adopted an "intelligence-as-service" strategy, focused on providing solutions for managing the performance and risk of CRE assets. In 2021, it acquired two CRE data analytics providers: Stratodem, and Reonomy. It also acquired Finance Active, a provider of debt management software.

In February 2022, Altus Group announced that Jim Hannon, currently President of Altus Analytics, will succeed Mike Gordon as CEO, effective April 1, 2022.

Business 

The company has two business segments: Altus Analytics, and Commercial Real Estate (CRE) Consulting .  Altus Analytics  provides software and data analysis } for the commercial real estate industry. The  CRE Consulting segment focuses on property tax, valuations advice and cost consulting. 

The Altus Analytics'  segment consists of global software products sold under the Argus brand, appraisal management data analytics programs and Canadian data subscription products. Its clients consist of CRE asset and investment management firms, including large owners, managers and investors of CRE assets and CRE funds, as well as other CRE industry participants including service providers, brokers, and developers. The programs provide visibility at the asset, portfolio and fund level to help clients enhance performance of their CRE investments.

The CRE Consulting segment consists of property tax, valuation  and cost advisory services. The company works with CRE market participants - including owner operators, developers, financial institutions, and various CRE asset holders and investors. The property tax services are offered in Canada, the US and the UK.

In 2019, Altus Group’s consolidated revenues were 39% from Canada, 37% from the US, 18% from Europe, and 6% from Asia Pacific.  In 2019, 38% of consolidated revenues came from the Property Tax business, 36% from Altus Analytics, 19% from Valuation and Cost Advisory and 7% from Geomatics.

References 

Companies based in Toronto
Software companies of Canada
Consulting firms of Canada
Companies listed on the Toronto Stock Exchange
Real estate companies of Canada
Financial software companies
Canadian companies established in 2005
Software companies established in 2005
2005 establishments in Ontario